Kani Sharif (also Romanized as Kānī Sharīf; also known as Şafā’īyeh and Shāh Godār) is a village in Hasanabad Rural District, in the Central District of Ravansar County, Kermanshah Province, Iran. At the 2006 census, its population was 221, in 51 families.

References 

Populated places in Ravansar County